is a railway station in the city of  Ichinomiya, Aichi Prefecture, Japan, operated by Central Japan Railway Company (JR Tōkai).

Lines
Kisogawa Station is served by the Tōkaidō Main Line, and is located 388.6 kilometers from the starting point of the line at Tokyo Station.

Station layout
The station has one island platform with an elevated station building by a footbridge. The station building has automated ticket machines, TOICA automated turnstiles and is staffed.

Platforms

Adjacent stations

Station history
The station opened on 1 June 1886. With the privatization of Japanese National Railways (JNR) on 1 April 1987, the station came under the control of JR Central.

Station numbering was introduced to the section of the Tōkaidō Line operated JR Central in March 2018; Kisogawa Station was assigned station number CA73.

Surrounding area
Kuroda Elementary School
Kisogawa Hospital

See also
 List of Railway Stations in Japan

References

Yoshikawa, Fumio. Tokaido-sen 130-nen no ayumi. Grand-Prix Publishing (2002) .

External links

official home page 

Railway stations in Japan opened in 1886
Railway stations in Aichi Prefecture
Tōkaidō Main Line
Stations of Central Japan Railway Company
Ichinomiya, Aichi